Little Waterhouse Lake is a freshwater coastal lagoon in the Waterhouse Conservation Area of north-eastern Tasmania, Australia. In 1982 it was designated a wetland of international importance under the Ramsar Convention.

Description
The  lake lies near Bass Strait behind coastal dunes and receives its water from local catchment runoff. It has high floral diversity, with over 40 species of aquatic and semi-aquatic plants. The site also supports the threatened Growling Grass Frog and Dwarf Galaxias.

See also

List of reservoirs and dams in Tasmania
List of lakes in Tasmania

References

Ramsar sites in Australia
Lakes of Tasmania
North East Tasmania